Russell Bussian (born 26 June 1973) is a former professional rugby league footballer who played in the 1990s and 2000s. He played at club level for the Gold Coast Chargers, Saint-Gaudens Bears, and the Limoux Grizzlies.

Playing career
Bussian grew up in Toowoomba where he attended Harristown State High School. He was graded by the Seagulls in 1992. He made his first grade debut from the bench in his side's 48−4 loss to the Canberra Raiders at Bruce Stadium in round 9 of the 1993 season. In the 1994 season, Bussian played in 11 games and scored 7 tries finishing as the season second to Wayne Bartrim as club's top try scorer. Bussian was released by the Seagulls at the end of the 1994 season.

In 2002, seven years after his stint with the Seagulls ended, Bussian headed to France to play for French side the Saint-Gaudens Bears in the Elite One Championship. Bussian's final appearance in first grade was for Elite One Championship side the Limoux Grizzlies in the 2010 season at 37 years of age. Bussian still continues to live in France.

References

1973 births
Living people
Australian emigrants to France
Australian expatriate rugby league players
Australian expatriate sportspeople in France
Australian people of French descent
Australian rugby league players
Gold Coast Chargers players
Limoux Grizzlies players
People from the Darling Downs
Rugby league centres
Rugby league fullbacks
Rugby league players from Toowoomba
Saint-Gaudens Bears players